Thysanoteuthis is a genus of large squid comprising one well-known species, the diamond squid, and two dubious taxa.

Species
? Thysanoteuthis danae
Thysanoteuthis nuchalis
Thysanoteuthis rhombus, diamond squid or diamondback squid

The species listed above with an asterisk (*) are questionable and need further study to determine if they are valid species or synonyms. The question mark (?) indicates questionable placement within the genus.

References

External links

Squid
Cephalopod genera
Taxa named by Franz Hermann Troschel